Apollonia is an ancient town (former Apollonia in Mygdonia) and a former municipality in the Thessaloniki regional unit, Greece. Since the 2011 local government reform it is part of the municipality Volvi, of which it is a municipal unit. It is located along the historical Via Egnatia in Macedonia, about midway between Thessaloniki and Amphipolis. The municipal unit Apollonia had 3,876 inhabitants in 2011. The municipal unit has an area of 168.393 km2.

References

Populated places in Thessaloniki (regional unit)